Cladopathidae is a family of cnidarians belonging to the order Antipatharia.

Genera:
 Chrysopathes Opresko, 2003
 Cladopathes Brook, 1889
 eteropathes Opresko, 2011
 Hexapathes Kinoshita, 1910
 Sibopathes van Pesch, 1914
 Trissopathes Opresko, 2003

References

Antipatharia
Cnidarian families